Atriplex australasica, the native orache, is a species of annual flowering plant in the family Amaranthaceae, native to southeastern Australia. A variable species, it is found in coastal areas and other wet, brackish situations.

References

australasica
Endemic flora of Australia
Flora of South Australia
Flora of New South Wales
Flora of Victoria (Australia)
Flora of Tasmania
Plants described in 1840